Sartang-e Dinar Ali (also Romanized as Sartang-e Dīnār ‘Ālī; also known as Deh-e Armandchī and Sartang) is a village in Khanmirza Rural District, Khanmirza District, Lordegan County, Chaharmahal and Bakhtiari Province, Iran. At the 2006 census, its population was 784, in 133 families. The village is populated by Lurs.

References 

Populated places in Lordegan County
Luri settlements in Chaharmahal and Bakhtiari Province